Seeta Bagriis a Pakistani television series which aired on TV One, on 17 November 2016. It is produced by Adnan Siddiqui under their banner Cereal Entertainment. Set against a minority of Hindu community in Karachi, the title role was played by Sarwat Gillani while Bushra Ansari, Syed Jibran and Hassan Niazi played the pivot roles.

It was retelecasted on PTV Home from November 2019 to March 2020 every Friday and Saturday at 7.00 P.M

Cast
Bushra Ansari as Nandini Daas
Hassan Niazi as Akash Chopra
Qavi Khan as Badrilal Bagri 
Sarwat Gilani as Seeta Bagri 
Shabbir Jan as Saeen 
Syed Jibran as Ratan Lal
Shameen Khan as Mala Rani
 Raeed Muhammad Alam as Taimur Jaki
 Vasiya Fatima as Alizey
Minor characters:
Tariq Butt as Police inspector 
Khawaja Saleem as Nathu Hakeem
Zubi majeed as Pooja 
Asad Butt as Alijey's cousin 
Abu Rohan as Haji
Sehzad Raza as thekedar Chacha ( friend of Badrilal and Mamaji of Akash )
Sajeerudin as Boss of Insan Dost foundation
Hanif Mohammad as Lawyer,  father of Taimur

Accolades

References

External links
 

Pakistani drama television series
2016 Pakistani television series debuts
2017 Pakistani television series endings
TVOne Pakistan
Pakistan Television Corporation original programming
Urdu-language television shows
Hindi-language television shows